At the Top of the Stairs is a 1983 French drama film starring Danielle Darrieux, and was directed by Paul Vecchiali. It tells the story of a widow, who returns to a former house that had been hers 18 years after her husband was killed.

Cast
Danielle Darrieux   as Françoise Canavaggia 
Hélène Surgère   as Suzanne  
Françoise Lebrun   as Michele   
Gisèle Pascal   as Rose  
Sonia Saviange   as Catherine  
Christine Laurent   as Christine  
Micheline Presle   as Mathilde

External links

1983 films
1983 drama films
French drama films
Films directed by Paul Vecchiali
1980s French films